Collecting Sunlight is the first EP from Swedish artist Andreas Moe. It was self-released in the UK on June 25, 2012, and received a wider release from Sony Music Sweden on the same date. The EP was highly anticipated worldwide, receiving rave reviews from music bloggers.

History

Collecting Sunlight - EP came when following break up's with each of their long term girlfriends, Andreas Moe and best friend Micael Paavilainen (videographer and creator of most of Moe's videos to date) moved together to the small Swedish town of Saltsjobaden in Winter 2011. Moe recalls it as a time of 'darkness, heartbreak and hibernation'—and reveals that it was only then that he found himself ready to channel his personal experiences into his music.

Having tried for years previous—it was only through heartbreak and solitude that Moe truly felt that he was beginning to develop 'his sound'. He admits that it was a painful process, and states that to explore his experiences while they were still so raw meant involving three writers and friends that he held close to his heart—Hiten Bharadia, Niclas Lundin and Maria Marcus. The foursome spent just two weeks writing and producing intensively—the result of which were the bare bones of The Collecting Sunlight EP.

Moe describes the final product as 'a true souvenir of his journey back to self'—and the sound as a fusion of electronic and organic sounds. The record was released on June 25, 2012.

Track listing

Reception
So far, the Collecting Sunlight EP has been received well worldwide, with several popular online blogs posting reviews and articles about the forthcoming release. Most notable perhaps, is famous US blogger Arjan Writes, who wrote '"Moe simply makes enchanting, emotionally honest pop music that is positioned right on the intersection of happiness and heartbreak." Other fans of Moe's include So So Gay, who posted a glowing introduction article teamed with a free download of song 'Volcanoes' in May 2012, as well as other popular music sites such as SBTV, LinkUpTV, Dropout UK, Music Is My Kingsize Bed, Rukkle and I Am Music TV.

Personnel
Artist
Andreas Moe: vocals, guitar, piano, engineering
Additional musicians
Maria Marcus
Niclas Lundin
Production
Andreas Moe and Maria Marcus - production
 Niclas Lundin and Cutting Room - mastering
Design
Micael Paavilainen – photography, hand lettering, layout design

References

2012 debut EPs
Synth-pop EPs